Codnor Park and Ironville railway station served the villages of Codnor Park and Ironville, Derbyshire, England from 1847 to 1967 on the Erewash Valley Line.

History 
The station opened on 6 September 1847 by the Midland Railway. It closed to both passengers and goods traffic on 2 January 1967.

Stationmasters

Francis Millington ca. 1857
Richard Smedley before 1859
W. Briero ca. 1859 - ca. 1866
John Ashton ca. 1871 - 1876 (afterwards station master at Matlock Bridge)
Endersbye Chapman 1876 - 1885
William Grant 1885 - 1890 (formerly station master at Sharnbrook)
George Henry Ward 1890 - 1895 
William Frederick Best 1895 - 1905 (formerly station master at Whitwell, afterwards station master at Pye Bridge)
Albert C. East 1905 - 1907 (formerly station master at Kimberley)
Edward Henry Baldwin 1907 - ca. 1914 (formerly station master at Didsbury)
Harold Smith
G. Cook until 1922 (afterwards station master at Ilkeston)
Lewis James Oldham 1922 - 1929
John Hitchens 1929 - 1937 (afterwards station master at Pye Bridge)
William Henry Smart from 1937 (formerly station master at Blakesley)
Albert Edward Ganderton until 1954 
Sigard Weatherill from 1955

References

External links 

Disused railway stations in Derbyshire
Railway stations in Great Britain opened in 1847
Railway stations in Great Britain closed in 1967
Former Midland Railway stations
Beeching closures in England
1847 establishments in England
1967 disestablishments in England